CEB (or Centro de Estudios de Bachillerato) is a chain of Mexican high schools (known in Mexico as ) which offers programs to upgrade the regular degree to a technical-professional level. It has campuses located in 21 states and in the Federal District.

All CEBs along with all PFLC and PREFECO high schools are part of the technical school of the Dirección General de Bachillerato (DGB), and are dependents of Secretaría de Educación Pública of Mexico.

Location
There are 34 CEBs in México:

See also
 CBTA (Centro de Bachillerato Tecnológico Agropecuario)
 CBTF (Centro de Bachillerato Tecnológico Forestal)
 CBTIS (Centro de Bachillerato Tecnológico Industrial y de Servicios)
 CETAC (Centro de Estudios Tecnológicos en Aguas Continentales)
 CETIS (Centro de Estudios Tecnológicos Industrial y de Servicios)
 CETMAR (Centro de Estudios Tecnológicos del Mar)
 PFLC (Preparatoria Federal Lázaro Cárdenas)
 PREFECO (Preparatoria Federal por Cooperación)

References

External links
 DGB

High schools in Mexico